John George Blencowe (28 February 1817 – 28 April 1900) was a British Liberal Party politician.

Family
Blencowe was the son of Robert Willis Blencowe and Charlotte Elizabeth Poole. He married Frances Campion, daughter of William John Campion (the younger) and Frances Read Kemp, in July 1857. Together they had eight children:
 Robert Campion Blencowe (1858–1905)
 John Ingham Blencowe (born 1860)
 William Poole Blencowe (1869–1900)
 Florence Charlotte Blencowe (1859–1944)
 Harriet Blencowe (1862–1943)
 Frances Isabel Blencowe (born 1864)
 Mary Blencowe (born 1865)
 Elizabeth Penelope Blencowe (born 1867)

Political career
He was elected MP for Lewes at a by-election in 1860 but stood down at the next election in 1865.

Other activities
Blencowe was also a Justice of the Peace and Deputy Lieutenant for Sussex.

References

External links
 

Liberal Party (UK) MPs for English constituencies
UK MPs 1859–1865
1817 births
1900 deaths